Minuscule 421 (in the Gregory-Aland numbering), α 259 (in Soden's numbering), is a Greek minuscule manuscript of the New Testament, on parchment. It is dated to year ca. 1300. Formerly it was designated by 64a and 69p. Marginal equipment is not complete.

Description 

The codex contains the text of the Acts of the Apostles, Catholic epistles, and Pauline epistles on 279 parchment leaves. The text is written in one column per page, in 22 lines per page.

Kurt Aland did not place the Greek text of this codex in any Category.

History 

Gregory dated the manuscript to the 12th century.

The manuscript was carefully written by John Tarchaniota. Auger Ghislain de Busbecq brought it, together with codex 425, from Constantinople to Vienna. The manuscript was examined by Treschow, Alter, and Birch. Alter used it in his edition of NT, vol 2, pp. 789–853. C. R. Gregory saw it in 1887. Formerly it was designated by 64a and 69p. In 1908 Gregory gave the number 421 to it.

The manuscript is currently housed at the Austrian National Library (Theol. gr. 303) in Vienna.

See also 

 List of New Testament minuscules
 Biblical manuscript
 Textual criticism

References

Further reading 

 Francis Karl Alter, Novum Testamentum Graecum, ad Codicem Vindobonensem Graece expressum: Varietam Lectionis addidit Franciscus Carolus Alter, 2 vols. 8vo, Vienna, 1787, vol. 2, pp. 789–853.

Greek New Testament minuscules
14th-century biblical manuscripts